Oleksandr Tkachuk (born 20 November 1985) is a Ukrainian former professional football midfielder.

Tkachuk played for Lokomotiv Minsk in the 2003 Belarusian Premier League.

External links
 
 
 

1985 births
Living people
Sportspeople from Chernivtsi
Ukrainian footballers
Association football midfielders
Ukrainian expatriate footballers
Expatriate footballers in Belarus
Expatriate footballers in Uzbekistan
Expatriate footballers in Hungary
Expatriate footballers in Syria
Ukrainian expatriate sportspeople in Syria
FC Bukovyna Chernivtsi players
FC SKVICH Minsk players
SC Tavriya Simferopol players
FC Kryvbas Kryvyi Rih players
FC Kryvbas-2 Kryvyi Rih players
SC Olkom Melitopol players
Fehérvár FC players
FC Feniks-Illichovets Kalinine players
Al-Ittihad Aleppo players
FC Zirka Kropyvnytskyi players
Syrian Premier League players